James Biery (born 1956) is an American organist, composer and conductor who is Minister of Music at Grosse Pointe Memorial Church (Presbyterian) in Grosse Pointe Farms, Michigan, where he directs the choirs, plays the 66-rank Klais organ and oversees the music program of the church. Prior to this appointment Biery was music director for Cathedrals in St. Paul, Minnesota and Hartford, Connecticut.

Education
Biery was educated at Northwestern University, where he earned Bachelor and Master of Music degrees in Organ Performance as a student of Grigg Fountain and Wolfgang Rübsam. Mr. Biery also holds the Choirmaster and Fellowship Certificates of the AGO.

Awards
Since 2006 James Biery has been awarded the ASCAP Plus award annually for his compositions. In 1986, he was the prize-winner for the highest score on the FAGO exam administered by the American Guild of Organists.  The winner of several organ competitions, he was named Second Prize Winner in the 1980 AGO National Open Competition in Organ Playing.

Works
His organ and choral compositions are published by MorningStar Music Publishers, Concordia, Augsburg Fortress, GIA, Oregon Catholic Press, and Boosey & Hawkes.  He has recorded for AFKA and Naxos.

Mr. Biery developed his compositional skills from two disciplines: years of study of the organ and its literature and intense scrutiny of the orchestral scores of numerous composers whose music he transcribed for organ duet and organ solo.  As an organist, Biery has distinguished himself by performing much of the repertoire of the nineteenth and early twentieth centuries.  His facility at the organ combined with his demonstrated ability to perform and study a vast amount of literature has given Biery a firm basis upon which to compose for the instrument.

Choral
^ Part of the St. Louis Cathedral choral series

References

1956 births
Living people
American male composers
21st-century American composers
American male organists
21st-century organists
21st-century American male musicians
American organists